"The Last Barfighter" is the 22nd and final episode of the thirty-second season of the American animated television series The Simpsons, and the 706th episode overall. It aired in the United States on Fox on May 23, 2021. The episode was directed by Timothy Bailey and written by Dan Vebber.

In the episode, a parody of John Wick: Chapter 2 and John Wick: Chapter 3 – Parabellum, a secret society of bartenders seeks ultimate vengeance on Homer and his friends after Moe breaks their most sacred rule. Ian McShane voices Artemis, a parody of his John Wick character Winston.

Plot
When a Krusty the Clown taping is cancelled, Milhouse convinces Bart to sneak into the audience of a Spanish-language game show. Bart gets picked to participate in an audience prize round, and chooses a crystal skull that Homer later reveals to be a novelty bottle for a rare and expensive tequila. After constant taunting from Bart, Homer eventually steals the skull and takes it to Moe’s Tavern, where Homer, Lenny, Carl, and Barney invite Moe to drink with them.

After a chaotic, drunken night, Moe reveals several secrets about Springfield’s residents, eventually exposing Homer and his friends’ secrets too, at which point they abandon Moe. Moe visits a secret society of bartenders at "The Confidential" hotel, and the society says that Moe broke their most sacred rule by running his mouth to Homer and his friends. The society threatens that they will inject his regulars with "Anti-Booze", a serum preventing the receiver from consuming alcohol. Moe finds Homer, Lenny and Carl at the Nuclear Plant telling Homer to call Barney via FaceTime.

The four witness Barney being injected with the Anti-Booze, prompting them to go on the run where they are beset by bartenders attempting to inject them with the Booze. Moe attempts to fight them off, but Carl and Lenny are ultimately injected. Homer then returns home, pleading with Marge to leave Springfield. However, Dr. Hibbert is already there and, revealing his bartending background, injects Homer. Agonized by tremendous guilt, Moe leaves tearfully.

Three months later, the group are living their dreams but shortly after find Moe working at an omelette bar. Feeling bad for him, they re-establish him as their bartender. The Society offer the group the antidote to the Booze, but Homer refuses and leaves the bar. Homer is then chased by the Society again, who wish to forcibly give Homer the antidote.

During the credits, Bart, Lisa and Maggie find the broken remains of the skull Bart won. When the skull strangely manages to reform itself, the trio leave fearfully.

Production

Development
The thirty-second season was announced on February 6, 2019, and premiered on September 27, 2020, with this season being produced remotely. Bailey directed the animation, with Vebber writing the episode, its plot a parody of the John Wick films John Wick: Chapter 2 and John Wick: Chapter 3 – Parabellum, while the episode's name is a play on words of The Last Starfighter.

Casting
Ian McShane serves as the episode's guest-star appearance as Artemis, a parody of his John Wick character Winston.

Reception

Broadcast and ratings
In the United States, The episode premiered on May 23, 2021, as the season finale on Fox, preceding the second season premiere of Duncanvile. The episode received 1.02 million viewing figures, a usual towards the season.

Critical response
Tony Sokol of Den of Geek called the episode a perfect mix of secret societies, booze, and "a big, old, ugly head" as well as an "action-packed, and twisted installment" of season 32. Sokol also stated the episode was "a grand slam best watched on a wall at a dive bar. It leaves us with a subversively comic paradox," along with a statement about the episode's cliffhanger. He ultimately gave the episode 4.5 out of 5 stars.

References

External links
 

The Simpsons (season 32) episodes
2021 American television episodes
John Wick
Television episodes about revenge